My Foolish Heart is a double live album by American pianist Keith Jarrett's "Standards Trio" featuring Gary Peacock and Jack DeJohnette recorded in concert in July 2001 at the Montreux Jazz Festival in Switzerland and released on the ECM label in 2007.

While exalting the album as "[showing] the trio at its most buoyant, swinging, melodic and dynamic" Keith Jarrett also writes in the original notes that "If jazz is about swinging, energy, and personal ecstasy for the player and the listener, I can think of no other single concert by the trio that expresses these qualities so compehensively."

Summer 2001 Tour
My Foolish Heart was recorded during the "Standards trio" Summer 2001 European tour which, according to www.keithjarrett.org, offered 8 recitals and also produced The Out-of-Towners [ECM 1900].

 July 16 - Pinède Gould, Juan-les-Pins (France) during the Jazz à Juan festival
 July 18 - Palais des Congrès, Paris (France)
 July 20 - Perugia (Italy) during the Umbria Jazz Festival
 July 22 - Stravinsky Hall, Montreux (Switzerland) during the Montreux Jazz Festival
 July 26 - Teatro Malibran, Venice (Italy) 
 July 28 -  Bavarian State Opera, Munich (Germany) recorded and released as The Out-of-Towners 
 August 1 - La Roque d’Antheron (France)
 August 3 - Marciac (France)

Reception
The Allmusic review by Thom Jurek stated: "this document is a mindblower from start to finish, and there are moments when all you can do in response is look at the box slack-jawed and wonder if what you just heard really happened. It did and it does, over and over again. This set is a magical, wondrous moment in the life of a trio when it all comes pouring out as inspiration and mastery".

Track listing
CD 1
 "Four" (Miles Davis) - 9:09  
 "My Foolish Heart" (Ned Washington, Victor Young) - 12:25  
 "Oleo" (Sonny Rollins) - 6:37  
 "What's New?" (Johnny Burke, Bob Haggart) - 7:54  
 "The Song Is You" (Oscar Hammerstein II, Jerome Kern) - 7:43  
 "Ain't Misbehavin'" (Waller, Harry Brooks, Andy Razaf) - 6:41

CD 2
 "Honeysuckle Rose" (Razaf, Waller) - 6:45  
 "You Took Advantage of Me" (Lorenz Hart, Richard Rodgers) - 8:54  
 "Straight, No Chaser" (Thelonious Monk) - 10:05  
 "Five Brothers" (Gerry Mulligan) - 6:36  
 "Guess I'll Hang My Tears Out to Dry" (Sammy Cahn, Jule Styne) - 11:09  
 "Green Dolphin Street" (Bronisław Kaper, Ned Washington) - 8:18  
 "Only the Lonely" (Cahn, Jimmy Van Heusen) - 6:15

Total effective playing time: 1:40:40 (the album contains 7:56 applause approximately)

Personnel
Keith Jarrett – piano
Gary Peacock - bass
Jack DeJohnette - drums

Production
 Manfred Eicher - producer
 Martin Pearson - engineer (recording)
 Sascha Kleis - cover design
 Junichi Hirayama - liner photos
 Rose Anne Jarrett - photos

References 

Gary Peacock live albums
Jack DeJohnette live albums
Standards Trio albums
Keith Jarrett live albums
2007 live albums
ECM Records live albums
Albums produced by Manfred Eicher